Tingena eriphaea is a species of moth in the family Oecophoridae. It is endemic to New Zealand and has been found in Otago. This species is known to inhabit native beech forest.

Taxonomy 
This species was first described by Edward Meyrick in 1914 using specimens collected at Ben Lomond at an altitude of 2500 ft in November and named Borkhausenia eriphaea. In 1926 Alfred Philpott discussed and illustrated the genitalia of the male of this species. In 1928 George Hudson also discussed and illustrated this species in his book The butterflies and moths of New Zealand. In 1988 J. S. Dugdale placed this species within the genus Tingena. The male lectotype is held at the Natural History Museum, London.

Description 

Meyrick described this species as follows:

Distribution
This species is endemic to New Zealand and has been found in its type locality of Ben Lomond in Otago as well as in Dunedin.

Habitat 
This species inhabits native beech forest on mountain sides.

References

Oecophoridae
Moths of New Zealand
Moths described in 1914
Endemic fauna of New Zealand
Taxa named by Edward Meyrick
Endemic moths of New Zealand